The Sciences and The Arts Fountains are a pair of Bedford limestone fountains, one on either side of the main entrance to the Missouri State Capitol in Jefferson City, created by Robert Ingersoll Aitken. Each fountain consists of two basins—the lower  in diameter and the upper  feet in diameter. The latter are supported by drums on which allegorical figures are carved in relief. The four figures on each fountain alternate between male and female.

The figures on the Sciences fountain represent Geometry, Geology, Chemistry, and—since the figures are all classical in design—Astrology, the "elder sister" of Astronomy. Those on the Arts fountain represent Architecture, Sculpture, Painting, and Music.

The works were dedicated on October 6, 1924.

References

Buildings and structures in Missouri
Monuments and memorials in Missouri
Tourist attractions in Jefferson City, Missouri
1924 sculptures
Outdoor sculptures in Missouri
Nude sculptures in the United States